Argon Zark! is a webcomic, created by cartoonist and web site designer Charley Parker. The strip, drawn using a graphics tablet and computer graphics software, first appeared in June 1995. A collection, billed as a "Dead Tree Souvenir Edition", was published in 1997. The strip was last updated in September 2019.

Synopsis
Argon Zark! is about a hacker who has created a new Internet protocol, named "Personal Transport Protocol" or "PTP", which enables the physical transport of people or objects through the Internet. On his first test of the new protocol, he is joined by his "Personal Digital Assistant" Cybert, and a delivery girl named Zeta Fairlight who is accidentally caught in the action when Argon and Cybert enter the computer and the World Wide Web.

References

Bibliography

Books 
  Parker, Charley (1997). Argon Zark!, Arclight Publishing
  Iuppa, Nicholas V. (1998). Designing Digital Media, page 149 plus CD-ROM content, Focal Press
  Alspach, Jennifer (1998). Photoshop and Illustrator Studio Secrets, pp. 223–229 IDG Books
  McCloud, Scott (2000). Reinventing Comics, pp. 165, 214, Paradox Press
  Withrow, Stephen (2003). Toon Art: The art of Digital Cartooning, pp. 45 118–119, 184 Watson-Guptill
  Hartas. Leo (2004). How to Draw and Sell Digital Cartoons, pp. 17, 60, 72, Barron's Educational Series

Periodicals 
  Kurtz, Frank (December 1996). "Panels and Frames", Internet Underground

Newspapers
 Sunday Tech section (August 25, 1996). The Houston Chronicle
 Macklin, William H. (June 5, 1997). "Cyber Hero to the Rescue", The Philadelphia Inquirer, pp. F1, F3,  Knight Ridder Wire Services
 Carrington, Penelope M. (June 6, 1997). "Argon's World", Richmond Times-Dispatch, pp. E1, E6-7, E11

External links
 Dinosaur Cartoons by Charley Parker

Webcomics in print
Science fiction webcomics
American comedy webcomics
1990s webcomics
2000s webcomics
2010s webcomics
1995 webcomic debuts